Charm Osathanond (born 1987) is a Thai actress, model and host who won the Miss Thailand Universe pageant in 2006.

Biography
Charm Osathanond is an only child who was raised in Nonthaburi near Bangkok

In 2005, she graduated from International School Bangkok, which was where she befriended a Thai singer, Lydia. She got B.A in Communication Management (Second-class honor) from Chulalongkorn University.

Personal life
In December 2015, she was married to an Australian businessman who she has befriended at the International School Bangkok.

Pageantry
On March 25, 2006, Charm Osathanond was crowned seventh Miss Thailand Universe in Bangkok by reigning Miss Universe 2005 Natalie Glebova of Canada.

As Miss Thailand Universe, she represented Thailand in the Miss Universe 2006 pageant which was televised live internationally from the Shrine Auditorium in Los Angeles, California on July 23, 2006.

After competing in the preliminary competitions, Osathanond made the top twenty during the pageant final becoming the first semi-finalist from Thailand since Porntip Nakhirunkanok won the title in 1988 18 years prior.  The pageant was won by Zuleyka Rivera of Puerto Rico.

Facts/Trivia
Charm was called out to the semi-finals, thus ending Thailand's drought without placement (18 years) since 1988 when Porntip Nakhirunkanok won the crown in Taipei, Taiwan.

She was asked and accepted a judging position at the 2008 Miss Bhutan pageant. Bhutan is known for being on the most isolated countries in the world.

Filmography

Television

Film

External links
Charm Osathanond on Facebook
Official site of Miss Thailand Universe 2006
MU 2006 Top 20 Announcement
Sawasdee Pageant The Majestic World of Beauty Pageant
 

1987 births
Living people
Charm Osathanond
Charm Osathanond
Miss Universe 2006 contestants
Charm Osathanond
Charm Osathanond
Charm Osathanond
Charm Osathanond
Charm Osathanond